Mega Records was a Danish record label established in 1983. It was renamed Edel-Mega Records when it was acquired by Edel Music in 2001. Mega's catalogue is now managed by Playground Music Scandinavia, which was spun off from Edel in 2010.

Their most internationally successful artist is the Swedish pop group Ace of Base, who have to date sold over 30 million records worldwide. Nicki French also released a single under their label.

The name Mega Records, Denmark, which still appears on American releases of Ace of Base's albums, refers now to an in-name-only unit of Playground Music Scandinavia which licenses this part of its catalog to Sony Music, owner of Arista Records and a successor of Bertelsmann Music Group.

See also
 List of record labels

References

Danish record labels
Record labels established in 1983
Pop record labels